Tim Koch may refer to:
Tim Koch (guitarist), member of Heartist
Tim Koch, musician signed to Merck Records